Maitri Vilaikit (born 18 January 1944) is a Thai sprinter. He competed in the men's 4 × 100 metres relay at the 1964 Summer Olympics.

References

1944 births
Living people
Athletes (track and field) at the 1964 Summer Olympics
Maitri Vilaikit
Maitri Vilaikit
Place of birth missing (living people)
Maitri Vilaikit